The Last Stand is a 1938 American Western film  directed by Joseph H. Lewis. It is an early example of the western detective story.

Cast
Bob Baker, Tip Douglas the Laredo Kid
Constance Moore, Nancy Drake
Fuzzy Knight, Pepper
Earle Hodgins, Thorn Evans 
Forrest Taylor,	 Turner
Glenn Strange, Henchman Joe
Sam Flint, as Calhourn
Jimmy Phillips, Henchman Tom
Jack Kirk Henchman Ed

References

1938 films
1938 Western (genre) films
American Western (genre) films
American black-and-white films
1930s American films